The Rev. Donald MacNicol (1735–1802), was a Scottish clergyman,  Minister of Saddell and Lismore in Argyll, and an author. He was the son of Nicol Macnicol of Succoth, Argyll, and the nephew of Alexander Stewart of Invernahyle in the Strath of Appin. He is perhaps best known for his Remarks On Dr. Samuel Johnson's Journey To The Hebrides, a work which commented rather vituperatively on Dr. Johnson's equally insulting A Journey to the Western Islands of Scotland.

The Rev. MacNicol assisted the renowned Gaelic poet, Duncan Ban MacIntyre, by transcribing over 6,000 lines of the illiterate man's work. MacNicol is also remembered for his Gaelic poem of lost love, entitled "Mo Shùil Ad Dhèidh." (English: "My Eye is After You")

Chorus:

Ochoin a chailin 's mo shùil ad dhèidh"	 A chailin, mo chailin 's mo shùil ad dhèidhA Lili, mo Lili 's mo shùil ad dhèidhCha lèir dhomh am bealach le sileadh nan deurEnglish Translation:Alas, my girl, my eye is after youGirl, my girl, my eye is after youLily, my Lily, my eye is after youI can't see the mountain pass for the flowing of tears''

The thirty-five-year-old Rev. MacNicol wrote the poem in lament of being snubbed by Lillias Campbell, a local laird's daughter. He had requested the seventeen-year-old girl's hand in marriage, but Lillias had already accepted the hand of her cousin, Captain Alexander Campbell. However, Sir Alexander made an ungallant bet with a servant which left the incensed Lillias no choice but to accept the alternate proposal of the Rev. MacNicol. They married just after her eighteenth birthday, and would go on to have sixteen children.  The poem was later set to music and remains a popular Highland folk song.

References

18th-century Ministers of the Church of Scotland
18th-century Scottish poets
1735 births
1802 deaths
People from Lismore, Scotland
18th-century Scottish Gaelic poets